Clue Classic is a single-player, interactive video game based on Hasbro's Cluedo franchise. It was developed by Games Cafe and published by Reflexive Entertainment on June 3, 2008.

Gameplay
Mobygames explains the gameplay:

Development 
The game was inspired by the artwork in the 2002/2003 Classic Detective Game version, featuring the original six characters, weapons, and nine original rooms. 

 Producer – Rob Adams
 Designer – Rob Adams
 Programmer – Chad Sterling
 Lead Artist – Erin Miller
 Music & Sound – Staffan Melin and David Chan.

Reception
BoardGameBeast rated the game 4 out of 5 stars, describing it as "a truly perfect rendition of the classic English board game [with] great graphics and creepy atmosphere". It criticised the lack of multiplayer option, and the fact that Hasbro stopped download editions. Gamezebo rated the game 4 stars out of 5, saying the good included "animations and sound effects; faithfully reproduces tabletop edition's mechanics; charm and personality; eliminates much of the real game's hands-on busywork", and the bad included "no head-to-head multiplayer; can get repetitive; need to sit through canned animations".

References

2008 video games
Cluedo
Detective video games
Video games based on board games
Video games developed in the United States
Windows games
MacOS games
Reflexive Entertainment games